KZYN (104.1 FM, "Zion 104.1") is a commercial radio station that is licensed to Toquerville, Utah and serves the St. George area. The station is owned by G. Craig Hanson, through licensee Redrock Broadcasting, Inc. and broadcasts a classic rock format.

History
The station was assigned the KSGX call letters by the Federal Communications Commission on November 17, 2015. KSGX began regular broadcast operations in November 2018.

On November 13, 2018, Redrock introduced "Zion 104.1", an adult album alternative (AAA)-formatted station, on the 104.1 FM frequency. New call letters KZYN were selected to match the new branding, which takes its name from nearby Zion National Park.

References

External links

ZYN
Radio stations established in 2018
2018 establishments in Utah
Classic rock radio stations in the United States